Praful Manoharbhai Patel (born 17 February 1957) is an Indian Nationalist Congress Party politician, industrialist and sports administrator.

He was the president of India's association football governing body the All India Football Federation (AIFF) from 2009 till 2022 when the Committee of Administrators (CoA) took over the interim administration following the appointment by the Supreme Court. He became the Asian Football Confederation's vice president of the SAFF region at the AFC Congress held in Bahrain in 2015. In December 2016 he was appointed as the Senior Vice President of the Asian Football Confederation. In 2017, He became a member of a FIFA Finance Committee for a term of four years.

Early life and education
Patel is the son of Indian National Congress politician Manoharbhai Patel, who represented Gondia in the Maharashtra Legislative Assembly. His father died when Patel was 13. His family runs the CEEJAY group tobacco conglomerate. He attended Mumbai's Campion School, and the Sydenham College of Commerce and Economics. He graduated with a Bachelor of Commerce degree from the University of Bombay.

Career

Political career
Patel followed in his father's footsteps in choosing a political career. In 1985, he became the president of the Gondia Municipal Council, and in the 1991 Indian general election was elected to the 10th Lok Sabha. In 1996 and 1998 he was re-elected to the 11th Lok Sabha and 12th Lok Sabha respectively. Patel has served on a number of parliamentary committees, including the Consultative Committee of the Ministry of Environment and Forests (1991–1996), the Committee on Science and Technology (1994–1995), the Committee on Home Affairs (1995–1996), the Committee on Finance (1996–97), and the Consultative Committee of the Ministry of Civil Aviation. He was elected to the Rajya Sabha as a representative of Maharashtra in 2000. He was re-elected to the Rajya Sabha for his second term in 2006, and in the 2009 was elected to the 15th Lok Sabha for a fourth term. He was elected to the Rajya Sabha from Maharashtra in 2016.

From 2004 to 2011, Patel was served as the Minister of Civil Aviation. In this role, the government increased the foreign direct investment cap in the domestic airlines sector from 40% to 49%. On 19 January 2011, Patel was relieved of Civil Aviation portfolio and became the cabinet minister for Minister of the Heavy Industries and Public Enterprises.

On 9 January 2013, Patel launched the National Electric Mobility Mission Plan (NEMMP) 2020 roadmap for introducing electric and hybrid vehicles in India. Patel launched a project to build the world's largest solar power plant near Sambhar Lake in Rajasthan. The project was planned to generate roughly 4000 MW of power, but following protest from environmental groups, the project site was moved to Kharaghoda in Surendranagar district of Gujarat.

AIFF President
In 2013, Patel placed a bid for India to host the 2015 and 2016 FIFA World Club Championships.

Under Patel, the All India Football Federation (AIFF) introduced the Indian Super League run by the Football Sports Development Pvt Ltd., which aims to make Indian football more competitive at an international level. In April 2014, Patel announced of the eight franchise owners in the Indian Super League.

Patel signed agreements with the German Football Association (DFB), the French Football Federation (FFF) and the Japan Football Association (JFA) in 2015 for their support and expertise for the "mutual growth, promotion and continuous emphasis on the development of football."

Patel brought back international friendlies to India, with Mumbai awarded its first international match in 61 years when India hosted Puerto Rice in 2016. Praful has said that India will host more friendly matches in the future.

On 28 March 2016, Patel announced the commencement of a women's league later in 2016. In a Special General Body Meeting of the AIFF held in New Delhi, a women's league was introduced in line with Patel's plans to place more emphasis on women's football. On 17 October 2016, the women's football league trial kicked off for the first time in India in the city of Cuttack. On 24 January 2017 AIFF President Praful Patel launched the inaugural edition of the Indian Women's League at New Delhi. The league will commence from 28 January with six teams participating in it.

On 1 December 2016, Patel was appointed as the senior vice president of the Asian Football Confederation. India subsequently won the rights to host the FIFA U-17 World Cup India 2017 and hosted the AFC U-16 Championship in September 2016. The All India Football Federation has also won the AFC Developing Member Association of the Year Award at the AFC's Annual Awards 2016 held in Abu Dhabi, United Arab Emirates.

On 21 January 2016, Praful Patel was elected unopposed as the AIFF President for the third consecutive terms.

Patel was removed from his presidency of the AIFF by the Supreme Court and replaced by a Committee of Administrators (CoA) after failing to organise presidential elections despite his third term expiring in December 2020.

Alleged role in AIFF's suspension by FIFA
In August 2022, FIFA suspended the All India Football Federation for violating its statutes on third-party interference. India was stripped off its hosting rights for international football tournaments, including the 2022 FIFA U-17 Women's World Cup scheduled for October 2022. Patel who had stayed in office as the AIFF president despite his third term expiring in December 2020 had been replaced by a Supreme Court appointed Committee of Administrators (CoA). Patel was accused of orchestrating the AIFF's suspension by arranging a letter from FIFA and the Asian Football Confederation threatening AIFF with a suspension if he wasn't restored to its presidency. The Supreme Court dissolved the CoA and restored day-to-day management to the AIFF on August 22. FIFA lifted its suspension of the AIFF on August 26, and restored it the rights of the U-17 Women's World Cup.

Memberships and chairman positions
Patel is chairman of the Manoharbhai Patel Charitable Trust, which funds the Manoharbhai Patel Institute of Engineering and Technology, the president of the Gondia Education Society, the Gondwana Club, Nagpur Lions International Club, the Cricket Club of Mumbai and Mumbai Cricket Association.

Personal life
He married Varsha Patel, the daughter of a Gujarati businessman, on 10 February 10, 1977. They have one son - Prajay - and three daughters - Poorna, Niyati and Avni.

References

External links

 Official website
 President – All India Football Federation

1957 births
Living people
Union ministers of state of India
Politicians from Kolkata
India MPs 1991–1996
India MPs 1996–1997
India MPs 1998–1999
India MPs 2009–2014
Union ministers of state of India with independent charge
People from Gondia
Rajya Sabha members from Maharashtra
Union Ministers from Maharashtra
Nationalist Congress Party politicians from Maharashtra
Lok Sabha members from Maharashtra
United Progressive Alliance candidates in the 2014 Indian general election
Civil aviation ministers of India
Gujarati people
Indian sports executives and administrators
Indian football executives
Presidents of the All India Football Federation